Axenstar (formerly called Powerage) is a Swedish power metal band from Västerås, founded in 1998 by Peter Johansson and Magnus Ek.

Band members

Current
Magnus Winterwild - vocals, bass, keyboards (1999–Present)
Joakim Jonsson - guitar (2005–Present) - Johnsson also plays for Skyfire
Jens Klovegård - guitar (2009–Present)
Adam Lindberg - drums (2008–Present)

Former
Mr. Eddie - vocals (1998–1999)
Johan Burman - drums (1998–1999)
Magnus Söderman - guitars (1998–1999)
Thomas Eriksson - guitar (1999–2005)
Peter Johansson - guitar (1998–2005)
Magnus Ek - bass (1998–2006)
Pontus Jansson - drums (1999–2006)
Brute Hanson - vocals, guitar (1999–2005)
Thomas Ohlsson - drums (2006–2008)
Henrik Sedell - bass (2006–2008)

Timeline

As Powerage

Discography

Studio albums
Perpetual Twilight (2002)
Far from Heaven (2003)
The Inquisition (2005)
The Final Requiem (2006)
Aftermath (2011)
Where Dreams Are Forgotten (2014)
End Of All Hope (2019)

EPs/demos
The Beginning (as Powerage) (2000) 
Promo 2001 (2001)

References

External links
 Official website

Swedish power metal musical groups
Musical groups established in 1998
1998 establishments in Sweden